Secu is a commune in Dolj County, Oltenia, Romania with a population of 1,400 people. It is composed of four villages: Comănicea, Secu, Smadovicioara de Secu and Șumandra.

References

Communes in Dolj County
Localities in Oltenia